Luís de Figueiredo e Lemos (born 1544 in Porto) was a Portuguese clergyman and bishop for the Roman Catholic Diocese of Funchal. He was ordained in 1586. He was appointed bishop in 1585. He died in 1608.

References 

1544 births
1608 deaths
Portuguese Roman Catholic bishops